A Story-Gram From Vinyl Cafe Inc. (2004) is a two-CD album by Stuart McLean released by Vinyl Cafe Productions.

McLean's The Vinyl Cafe is one of CBC Radio's most popular programs. The show relates the fictional escapades of Dave, eccentric owner of a small record store called The Vinyl Cafe, which lends Stuart music for his show. Dave tells Stuart stories about his life, his friends, and his family: wife Morley and children Stephanie and Sam.

The most popular stories tend to be lengthy tales in which Dave's adventures become more sidesplitting and out of control  with each of the stories being between 18 and 25 minutes in length. There are over 2 hours of stories in all on this set and a bonus video of Stuart performing "I Need to Pee".

Recorded in concert for the CBC Radio show The Vinyl Cafe.

Track listing
Disc 1
 "Dad is Dying" – 25:04
 "Gifted" – 22:46
 "Tree of Heaven" – 21:25

Disc 2
 "The Phone Message" – 23:42
 "Labour Pains" – 18:26
 "Morley's Book Club" – 19:57
 Bonus Video: "I Need to Pee" – 9:10

See also
Stuart McLean
The Vinyl Cafe
List of Dave and Morley stories

References

External links
 Vinyl Cafe with Stuart McLean – The Official Website

Stuart McLean albums
2004 live albums